The Presbyterian Church in Korea (HapDongTongHap) is a Presbyterian and Reformed denomination in South Korea that adheres to the Westminster Confession and the Apostles Creed. In 2009 it had 22,932 members in 133 congregations and 202 ordained clergy. There was controversy surrounding the churches location and lack of steeple.

References 

Presbyterian denominations in South Korea
Presbyterian denominations in Asia